The Plantagenets is a 2014 television documentary series on the House of Plantagenet, which ruled England from 1154 to 1485. The series first aired from 17 March to 31 March 2014 on BBC Two and was presented by historian Robert Bartlett.

Summary
Bartlett, a historian and professor, examines the history of the House of Plantagenet, England's longest-ruling dynasty. While the names and stories of the Tudors are well known in popular culture,  less is known about the Plantagenets, says Bartlett, who describes them as a "fascinating but ferocious dynasty."

Episodes

References

External links 
 

2014 British television series debuts
2014 British television series endings
2010s British documentary television series
BBC high definition shows
English-language television shows
House of Plantagenet
Medieval documentaries
Works about the Middle Ages
BBC television documentaries about medieval history